The Hothouse (1958/1980) is a full-length tragicomedy written by Harold Pinter in the winter of 1958 between The Birthday Party (1957) and The Caretaker (1959).  After writing The Hothouse in the winter of 1958 and following the initial commercial failure of The Birthday Party, Pinter put the play aside; in 1979 he re-read it and directed its first production, at Hampstead Theatre, where it opened on 24 April 1980, transferring to the Ambassadors Theatre on 25 June 1980, and it was first published, also in 1980, by Eyre Methuen. The play received its American premiere at the Trinity Repertory Company in 1982. Pinter himself played Roote in a subsequent production staged at the Minerva Theatre, in Chichester, in 1995, later transferring to the Comedy Theatre, in London.

Setting
The play is set in an institution whose nature is subject to interpretation; throughout the play, it is ambiguously referred to as both a "rest home" and a "sanitorium" but its "residents" or "patients" are designated anonymously by numbers, not by their names.

Plot
The professionalism and even sanity of the institution's director, Roote, are undermined by his subordinates: the efficient and ambitious Gibbs, the aptly named alcoholic Lush, and Miss Cutts, Roote's calculating and shrewd mistress who is also involved with Gibbs.  After the reported murder of one patient and the rape and resulting pregnancy of another, Roote orders Gibbs to find the perpetrator(s), who it appears is Roote himself, and Gibbs supplants his boss as administrator of the corrupt "rest home", whose inmates converge upon the staff, resulting in mayhem.

List of characters
Roote, a man in his fifties
Gibbs, a man in his thirties
Lush, a man in his thirties
Miss Cutts, a woman in her thirties
Lamb, a man in his twenties
Tubb, a man of fifty
Lobb, a man of fifty

Critical reception and interpretation
The play has been interpreted as a searingly comic indictment of institutional bureaucracy; its black comedy and absurdism exposing hierarchical power structures anticipate Pinter's later more overtly political dramatic sketches and plays, such as "The New World Order" (1983), One for the Road (1984), and Mountain Language (1988).

Productions

World premiere
"First presented at Hampstead Theatre, London, on 24 April 1980 and transferred to the Ambassador Theatre, London on 25 June 1980"; directed by Harold Pinter.

Cast:
Derek Newark, Roote
James Grant, Gibbs
Roger Davidson, Lamb
Angela Pleasence, Miss Cutts
Robert East, Lush
Michael Forrest, Tubb
Edward de Souza, Lobb

Other theatre personnel:
Eileen Diss, Set Designer
Elizabeth Waller, Costume Designer
Gerry Jenkinson, Lighting
Dominic Muldowney, Sound

American premiere
The American premiere was directed by Adrian Hall at the Trinity Repertory Company for its 1981–1982 season and transferred to the Playhouse Theatre in New York City, from 30 April through 30 May 1982, produced by Arthur Cantor Associates. Richard Kavanaugh, who played Gibbs, was nominated for "Best Performance by a Featured Actor" at the 36th Tony Awards in 1982.

Cast:
Dan Butler, Lamb
Peter Gerety, Lush
David C. Jones, Lobb
Richard Kavanaugh, Gibbs
Howard London, Tubb
George Martin, Roote
Amy Van Nostrand, Miss Cutts

Other theatre personnel:
Eugene Lee, Scenic and Lighting Design
William Lane, Costume Design

London revivals
A revival of The Hothouse, directed by Ian Rickson, with a cast including Stephen Moore (Roote), Lia Williams (Miss Cutts), and Henry Woolf (Tubb), was staged in the Lyttelton at the Royal National Theatre, London, from 11 July to 27 October 2007.

London 2013
During May–August 2013 the play was presented at Studio One in the West End Trafalgar Studios, directed by Jamie Lloyd. It starred Simon Russell Beale, John Simm, Indira Varma, Harry Melling, John Heffernan, Clive Rowe and Christopher Timothy.

Notes

Further reading

Merritt, Susan Hollis.  "Pinter Playing Pinter: The Hothouse."  The Pinter Review: Collected Essays 1995–1996.  Ed. Francis Gillen and Steven H. Gale.  Tampa, FL: University of Tampa Press, 1997. 73–84.  (For "Contents", see typed list at HaroldPinter.org.  [Note: there are some typographical errors.])

Pinter, Harold.  The Hothouse: A Play by Harold Pinter.  New York: Grove Press (Distributed by Random House), 1980. .

External links
 
"The Hothouse" at Harold Pinter.org – The Official Website of the International Playwright Harold Pinter

1958 plays
Plays by Harold Pinter
Methuen Publishing books
Tragicomedy plays